Rocco Siffredi (born Rocco Antonio Tano; 4 May 1964) is an Italian pornographic actor, director and producer.

Known as the "Italian Stallion", Siffredi has starred in more than 1,300 pornographic films. He is known for appearing in the "Buttman" series of adult movies and mostly for his anal scenes.

Pornography career 
Siffredi met porn actor Leonardo Codazzo in a French sex club in 1985 and was introduced to producer Marco and director Michela, who cast him in his first pornographic role, Attention fillettes... (Watch Out, Little Girls...) in 1987, in which he performed anal sex. He took his stage name from the character Roch Siffredi played by Alain Delon in the French gangster film Borsalino (1970). 

Siffredi then stepped away from porn and worked as a fashion model, but returned to the business after two years with the help of porn actress Teresa Orlowski. Siffredi went on to perform in both plot-based and gonzo-style pornography, with styles of sex ranging from ordinary to extreme. However, it was Siffredi's performances involving anal sex and anilingus, as well as rough sex and his psychological intensity and athleticism, which earned him recognition and ultimately a cult following.

Through collaboration with John Stagliano's Evil Angel studio and then his own Budapest-based Rocco Siffredi Produzioni as both a performer and director, Siffredi became one of the most powerful and recognizable personalities in pornography. "Rocco has far more power in this industry than any actress," Stagliano commented in 2001. Siffredi has credited Stagliano with being his mentor through all 30 years of his career.

Retirement 
In June 2004, Siffredi declared that he would retire from performing in porn for the sake of his children, and instead focus on direction and production. "My children are growing up," he said, "and I can no longer just say 'Dad is going to work to make money for the family.' They want to know more." Regarding Siffredi's long career, Axel Braun commented, "The problem is that he's been trying for years to find an 'heir to the throne', but it's no easy task. He thought he found him in Nacho Vidal, but then Nacho went his own way".

Siffredi, while continuing to direct, was largely absent as an on-screen performer for nearly five years. However, sexual frustration and disappointment as a director with his male talent and the state of the porn industry overall led Siffredi to return as a performer in 2009. Despite renewed success, Siffredi announced his retirement once again in 2015, shortly after appearing on the Italian reality television show L'Isola dei Famosi (Celebrity Island) which saw him stranded naked and alone on a beach for one week. He was reported to have told a friend, "I never felt so naked as I did then. I was all alone and it gave me a lot of time to think about what is important. And I realised I don't want to lose my wife." He later told the press, "More than a year ago I started to get uncomfortable in the front of the camera...Something inside of me has changed." However, he has continued performing sex in titles such as Rocco One on One and Rocco's Intimate Castings.

Style of pornography 
Actress Bobbi Starr noted of Siffredi, "Any girl in the industry who has been with him... will tell you that they have done things with him that they [would] never do with anyone else."

Speaking of his female partners, Siffredi says, "I want to see emotion... fear... excitement... the eyes going up from being surprised."

In mainstream media 

Siffredi is one of a few porn actors to enjoy crossover appeal and success with respect to other segments of the adult film industry, as well as some in mainstream media.

In 1999, he appeared in the controversial Catherine Breillat film Romance. His performance in this role was followed by a part specifically written for him by the same director in her 2003 film Anatomie de L'enfer (Anatomy of Hell), in which he played a gay man who became sexually involved with a woman. Both films featured unsimulated sexual scenes involving Siffredi, although it is disputed whether he actually had intercourse with co-star Caroline Ducey in Romance (she said no, Siffredi said yes). In 2012, he made a cameo as himself in the successful French comedy Porn in the Hood.

Siffredi is also visible in non-pornographic roles on Italian television, including television commercials for Amica Chips, a snack food, which have spawned considerable controversy and have at one point been taken off the air, a Cielo show, Ci pensa Rocco, and a La 5 docu-reality series, Casa Siffredi.

In 1997, Italian band Elio e Le Storie Tese dedicated a song and a video, "Rocco e Le Storie Tese", to Siffredi. Siffredi himself directed the video, also appearing in it. He also duetted with the band in the song "Un bacio piccolissimo" at the 63rd edition of the Sanremo Music Festival. He has also done a cameo appearance as himself in the 2018 Italian comedy film Natale a cinque stelle.

Personal life 

Siffredi is married to Rosa Caracciolo (born Rózsa Tassi), a Hungarian model whom he met in 1993 in Cannes and with whom he performed two years later in Tarzan X: Shame of Jane. Together they have two sons, Lorenzo and Leonardo. 

During his initial retirement starting in 2004, Siffredi battled sex addiction and disappeared from home for days to have sex, including with seniors, trans women, and men. Upon his decision to return to on-screen pornographic performance in 2009, Siffredi recounted, "I spoke with my wife and she said it's my problem only, it doesn't belong to her and the boys. And she said, 'You decided to stop; we never asked you. So if you want to go back, just go back". However, after a long period of intensive performing, with much time away from his home in Italy, Siffredi announced his retirement again in 2015 for the sake of his marriage. "Today I can see, my wife, she is the top priority", he said in a press statement. "She deserves to have what she wanted from day one, to be with only me without sharing with other girls". Caracciolo told the press, "I know him very well and I love him for who and what he is. Let's see what the new version of him will be like".

Siffredi discussed his personal life in 2015 on the reality television show L'Isola dei Famosi (Celebrity Island). Speaking of his sexuality, Siffredi discussed his sex addiction as emerging from "some kind of devil in me" and spoke of himself, "[It] sometimes sends me out of my mind". He discussed asking God for intervention from the spirit of his mother, whose photograph he always carries. He considers himself "a believer in God."

In popular culture 
 
 Siffredi is referenced in The Hold Steady song "Most People Are DJs" from 2004's Almost Killed Me.
 The Polish punk rock band Anti Dread wrote the song "Roko na Sterydach" ("Rocco on Steroids") about Siffredi.
 Mark Holcomb and Matt Halpern, of progressive metal band Periphery, are avid fans of Siffredi's work and quote his famous lines on-stage.
 Siffredi is referenced in the songs "Kundel Bury" and "Wina Satana" from the band Arka Satana.
 He is also referenced in the song "Padre Siffredi" from Danish hardcore band Barcode in the album Showdown (1995), including lyrics like "Size does matter, the bigger the badder".
 Underground cult filmmaker Carlos Atanes stated that Stanley Kubrick, David Lean and Rocco Siffredi were his main film references and he also said about Siffredi's work that "Agnes' scene in Rocco invades Poland or Gabriella Kerez' pool scene from True Anal Stories 9 are deeper than any Theo Angelopoulos' movie and show us the human inside more accurately than any Ingmar Bergman’s film".
 In French crime drama Braquo (season 2, episode 6), Internal Affairs Inspector Roland Vogel made a joke to a prostitute that his "tool" would make Rocco Siffredi "hide in shame".
 Siffredi is the male actor in the "It's Only Smellz" video that has become a popular meme.
 British band The Singing Pictures released a secret track named "Siffredi it" in reference to his porn acting style.
 Siffredi is referenced in the song "Rocco Siffredi" by the German rapper SSIO.
 In Dave Hutchinson's 2014 spy novel Europe in Autumn, Siffredi's name is used as a cover name for an agent.
 Siffredi is mentioned in the journal article "Pharmaco-pornographic Politics: Towards a New Gender Ecology" by Paul B. Preciado.
 In the upcoming Netflix series Supersex, Alessandro Borghi will portray Siffredi.

Filmography

Select pornographic
 Buttman's Ultimate Workout (1990)
 Curse of the Cat Woman (1991)
 Buttman's European Vacation (1991)
 New Wave Hookers 3 (1993)
 Bend Over Brazilian Babes 2 (1994)
 Buttman's Big Tit Adventure 3 (1995)
 Buttman & Rocco's Brazilian Butt Fest (2000)
 Buttman and Rocco Go to Montreal (2001)
 Fashionistas (2002)
 Rocco smashes tunes back doors in (2005)

Non-pornographic

Awards and nominations

AVN Awards

Won

Nominated

Hot d'Or Awards

NightMoves Awards

Ninfa Awards

Venus Awards

XBIZ Awards
Won

Nominated

XRCO Awards
Won

Nominated

Erotic Lounge Awards

See also 
 List of pornographic actors who appeared in mainstream films

References

Further reading

External links 

 
 
 
 

 

Italian male film actors
Italian male pornographic film actors
Italian pornographic film directors
Italian pornographic film producers
1964 births
Living people
People from Ortona
People of Sicilian descent
Playgirl Men of the Month
Participants in Italian reality television series
Italian Christians